Pure Pool is a pool video game by British developer VooFoo Studios in association with Ripstone Games for the PlayStation 4 and PC platforms. It was released on the PlayStation Store in North America on 29 July 2014 and Europe on 30 July 2014, with a physical edition of the PS4 version also being published by System 3 under their Play It label. The Microsoft Windows version was released worldwide via Steam on 30 July 2014. An Xbox One version was later released via the ID@Xbox self-publishing initiative on 14 November 2014. The game was released for the Nintendo Switch on November 17, 2020.

Description
The game features standard cue sports game types in addition to a game-specific mode called Accumulator. In career mode the game offers 40 hours of gameplay. The Official Sound Track (OST) of the game was composed by Etch Music, produced, recorded and mixed by Trevor Gibson at Circle (Recording) Studios in England, mastered by Zac at Zikis Mastering, was released by Supersaurus Records and is published by Integrity Publishing.

Development
Pure Pool was developed by VooFoo Studios in association with Ripstone Games. The teams collaborated on Pure Chess. The game builds on the team's previous title Hustle Kings, most noteworthy being the ball physics and the graphics.

References

External links

2014 video games
Cue sports video games
PlayStation 4 games
PlayStation Network games
Video games developed in the United Kingdom
Windows games
Xbox One games